Salmon Creek is an unincorporated community settlement and census-designated place (CDP) in Sonoma County, California, U.S. It is located on the Pacific coast about 90 minutes drive north of San Francisco, between the towns of Jenner and Bodega Bay, California. The population was 86 at the 2010 census.

The settlement is bounded to the north by Salmon Creek, to the east by State Route 1 and to the west and south by Sonoma Coast State Beach.

History
The Coast Miwok village of Pulya-lakum was formerly located near the mouth of Salmon Creek.

Geography
According to the United States Census Bureau, the CDP covers an area of 1.1 square miles (2.9 km), all of it land.

Demographics

2010
The 2010 United States Census reported that Salmon Creek had a population of 86. The racial makeup of Salmon Creek was 100.0% White (98.8% non-Hispanic). 1.2% of the population was Hispanic or Latino of any race.

The Census reported that 100% of the population lived in households.

There were 45 households, out of which 2 (4.4%) had children under the age of 18 living in them, 22 (48.9%) were opposite-sex married couples living together, 2 (4.4%) had a female householder with no husband present, 1 (2.2%) had a male householder with no wife present.  There were 1 (2.2%) unmarried opposite-sex partnerships, and 0 (0%) same-sex married couples or partnerships. 18 households (40.0%) were made up of individuals, and 5 (11.1%) had someone living alone who was 65 years of age or older. The average household size was 1.91.  There were 25 families (55.6% of all households); the average family size was 2.52.

The population was spread out, with 5 people (5.8%) under the age of 18, 3 people (3.5%) aged 18 to 24, 13 people (15.1%) aged 25 to 44, 42 people (48.8%) aged 45 to 64, and 23 people (26.7%) who were 65 years of age or older.  The median age was 59.0 years. For every 100 females, there were 104.8 males.  For every 100 females age 18 and over, there were 102.5 males.

The homeowner vacancy rate was 10.3%; the rental vacancy rate was 0%. 83.7% of the population lived in owner-occupied housing units and 16.3% lived in rental housing units.

2000
As of the Census 2000 the primary language spoken in the 94923 ZIP code were 83% English, 17% languages other than English including 13% Spanish, 2% German, 1% French, 1% Tagalog, and 1% Russian.

The population of the ZIP code was 1,769. However, that ZIP code also includes the town of Bodega Bay, California and rural areas. Salmon Creek was only designated a CDP for the 2010 census.

References

Populated coastal places in California
Census-designated places in Sonoma County, California
Unincorporated communities in California
Unincorporated communities in Sonoma County, California
Census-designated places in California